"Christmas Kisses" is a hit 1961 song by Ray Anthony and His Bookends, written by Joseph Kruger and Henrietta Gilden. The song has been included on many Christmas compilations such as The Best Christmas... Ever!.

References

1961 songs
American Christmas songs
Songs about kissing